Francisco Javier Gaxiola Castillo-Negrete (January 31, 1870 – November 18, 1933) was a Mexican lawyer, politician and diplomat.

Gaxiola was born in Sinaloa de Leyva, and taught in superior-level institutions of law in the Estado de México. As a diplomat, he was adviser to the Legation of Mexico in Madrid. From September 11, 1919, to March 8, 1920, he was acting Governor of the State of Mexico, while Agustín Millán Vivero, the original governor, accompanied President Venustiano Carranza, when the rebellion in Agua Prieta exploded. He died in Mexico City, aged 63.

Publications 
 El General Antonio Rosales : revista histórica del estado en Sinaloa de 1856 a 1865, 1894
 Gobernantes del estado de México; Muzquiz-Zavala-Olaguíbel, 1899

Decorations 
 Commander of the Orden de Isabel la Católica
 Commander of the Spanish Red Cross

References

External links 
 
 

Governors of the State of Mexico
20th-century Mexican lawyers
Mexican diplomats
People of the Mexican Revolution
Politicians from Sinaloa
1870 births
1933 deaths